Charles Reade was a dramatist.

Charles Reade may also refer to:

Charles Reade (town planner)

See also
Charles Read (disambiguation)
Charles Reid (disambiguation)
Charles Reed (disambiguation)